The 1994–95 Hartford Whalers season was the 23rd season of the franchise, 16th season in the NHL. Despite trading away star forward Pat Verbeek to the New York Rangers on March 23, 1995, the Whalers played solid over the next 16 games from March 25 to April 24, with a record of 8-7-1. However, the Whalers could not keep pace with the New York Rangers who went on to take 8th place in the Eastern Conference. It was the third consecutive season that the Whalers missed the playoffs. On a positive note, the Whalers had the most overtime wins and the best overtime record in the NHL, going 4-0-5. Darren Turcotte led all NHL skaters in overtime goals scored with 2.

Off-season
The Whalers announced on May 19 that head coach Pierre McGuire would not return to the club. McGuire took over the head coaching duties early in the 1993-94, as Paul Holmgren focused on his role as general manager of the team. In 67 games, McGuire led the Whalers to a 23-37-7 record.

On June 28, the Whalers selected Steve Martins in the 1994 NHL Supplemental Draft. Martins played the 1993-94 season with Harvard University, where he 25 goals and 60 points in 32 games.

At the 1994 NHL Entry Draft held at the Hartford Civic Center on June 28, the Whalers selected Jeff O'Neill from the Guelph Storm of the Ontario Hockey League with their first round, fifth overall selection. O'Neill scored 45 goals and 126 points in 66 games with the Storm during the 1993-94 season. The only other player that the Whalers selected in the draft that played in the NHL was Hnat Domenichelli, who Hartford selected in the fourth round.

On June 28, the NHL announced that the Whalers ownership transferred to the Compuware group, led by Peter Karmanos Jr., Thomas Thewes and Jim Rutherford. The group owned the Detroit Junior Red Wings of the Ontario Hockey League, originally named the Detroit Compuware Ambassadors, since they were awarded an OHL expansion franchise on December 11, 1989. Rutherford took over the general manager duties of the Whalers at this time, replacing Paul Holmgren, who returned to head coaching duties. Rutherford was a former NHL goaltender, amassing a 151-227-59 record with a 3.66 GAA in 457 games with the Detroit Red Wings, Pittsburgh Penguins, Toronto Maple Leafs and Los Angeles Kings in a career that spanned from 1970-1983. Following his playing career, Rutherford was the general manager of the Windsor Compuware Spitfires from 1985-1989. He then became the general manager of the Detroit Compuware Ambassadors/Detroit Junior Red Wings franchise from 1989-1994.

The Whalers signed free agent Jimmy Carson on July 13. Carson split the 1993-94 season between the Los Angeles Kings and Vancouver Canucks, as he scored 14 goals and 28 points in 59 games. Carson's best NHL season was in 1987-88 with the Kings, when he scored 55 goals and 107 points in 80 games. On August 9, 1988, Carson was traded to the Edmonton Oilers in a blockbuster trade in which Wayne Gretzky was traded to Los Angeles.

On August 18, the Whalers signed restricted free agent Steven Rice from the Edmonton Oilers. In 63 games, Rice scored 17 goals and 32 points during the 1993-94 season. As compensation for signing Rice, Hartford sent Bryan Marchment to the Oilers on August 30.

The Whalers acquired Glen Wesley from the Boston Bruins in a trade on August 26, sending their first round draft picks in the 1995 NHL Entry Draft, 1996 NHL Entry Draft and 1997 NHL Entry Draft to the Bruins. Wesley scored 14 goals and 58 points in 81 games during the 1993-94 season. He was drafted third overall by Boston in the 1987 NHL Entry Draft, and had accumulated 77 goals and 307 points in 537 games since beginning his career in the 1987-88 season.

Following the 1994-95 NHL lockout, which postponed the start of the season until January 1995, the Whalers participated in the waiver draft on January 18. Hartford selected Brian Glynn from the Vancouver Canucks and Kelly Chase from the St. Louis Blues. Glynn split the 1993-94 season with the Ottawa Senators and Canucks, scoring two goals and 15 points in 64 games. In 17 playoff games with Vancouver, Glynn had three assists. Chase played in 68 games with the Blues during the 1993-94, scoring two goals and seven points, along with 278 penalty minutes.

Regular season
The Whalers tied the Dallas Stars and the Toronto Maple Leafs for the lowest shooting percentage during the Regular season, with just 127 goals on 1,428 shots (8.9%)

Final standings

Schedule and results

Player statistics

Regular season
Scoring

Goaltending

Note: GP = Games played; G = Goals; A = Assists; Pts = Points; +/- = Plus-minus PIM = Penalty minutes; PPG = Power-play goals; SHG = Short-handed goals; GWG = Game-winning goals;
      MIN = Minutes played; W = Wins; L = Losses; T = Ties; GA = Goals against; GAA = Goals-against average;  SO = Shutouts; SA=Shots against; SV=Shots saved; SV% = Save percentage;

Awards and records

Transactions
The Whalers were involved in the following transactions during the 1994–95 season.

Trades

Waivers

Free agents

Draft picks
Hartford's picks at the 1994 NHL Entry Draft

See also
1994–95 NHL season

References
 Whalers on Hockey Database

 

1994-95
1994–95 NHL season by team
1994–95 in American ice hockey by team
Hart
Hart